Marcus Marigliani (born 5 December 1985) is an Australian rules footballer who played for the Essendon Football Club in the Australian Football League (AFL).

Marigliani was selected by Essendon with the fifty-fifth pick in the 2010 AFL Rookie Draft.  He was drafted from Frankston in the VFL where he was one of the most consistent performers in the league over the past couple of years, earning selection in the VFL Team of the Year in 2008 and 2009. He played a total of 98 games for Frankston during his career there.

Marigliani played only the last two games of the 2010 home and away season for Essendon, and was delisted at the end of the season. He performed strongly for Essendon's , Bendigo, during the year, and finished equal fifth in the J. J. Liston Trophy.

Marigliani resumed working as a carpenter after being delisted. He continued to play in the VFL, playing for Sandringham from 2011 until 2013, and served as club captain in 2013.

In 2014, he crossed to Port Melbourne, and in 2015 he returned to Essendon as a VFL-listed player in its reserves team.
He had the opportunity to return to the Essendon seniors during the 2015 NAB Challenge due to provisional suspensions being served by senior Essendon players during the club's supplements controversy. He was one of the best afield for Essendon in the 50-point defeat to St Kilda in the first NAB Challenge game.

References

External links

 Draft Profile on afl.com.au
 

Essendon Football Club players
Bendigo Football Club players
Frankston Football Club players
Port Melbourne Football Club players
Sandringham Football Club players
Australian rules footballers from Victoria (Australia)
Living people
1985 births